Adil Hermach (born 27 June 1986) is a former professional footballer who played as a defensive midfielder or centre-back.

Career
Born in Nîmes, France, Hermach represented the Morocco national team in the Olympics. he made his first cap for Morocco in a friendly match against Belgium on 26 March 2008.

After signing for Lens from Nîmes, Hermach played in RC Lens reserve team but for the 2007–08 season he was given a squad number for the first team. After the 2008–09 campaign, in which Lens relegated down to Ligue 2, he was a regular starting, making 22 appearances.

On 22 June 2011, he ended a six-year spell at Lens to join Saudi Premier League club Al-Hilal. He left the club on 27 December 2013.

External links
 
 

1986 births
Living people
French footballers
Footballers from Nîmes
Moroccan footballers
Association football midfielders
Association football defenders
Morocco under-20 international footballers
Morocco international footballers
Ligue 1 players
Ligue 2 players
Belgian Pro League players
Saudi Professional League players
UAE Pro League players
Championnat National 3 players
Championnat National 2 players
Nîmes Olympique players
RC Lens players
K.S.V. Roeselare players
Al Hilal SFC players
Toulouse FC players
Al Wahda FC players
Al Dhafra FC players
Ajman Club players
Stade Beaucairois players
French sportspeople of Moroccan descent
2012 Africa Cup of Nations players
2013 Africa Cup of Nations players
Moroccan expatriate footballers
Moroccan expatriate sportspeople in Belgium
Expatriate footballers in Belgium
Moroccan expatriate sportspeople in Saudi Arabia
Expatriate footballers in Saudi Arabia
Moroccan expatriate sportspeople in the United Arab Emirates
Expatriate footballers in the United Arab Emirates